Mother and Child may refer to:

Art
 Mother and Child (Gordine), a 1964 public artwork by Dora Gordine
 Mother & Child (Etrog), an abstract sculpture by Sorel Etrog
 Mother and Child (Cassatt), a painting by Mary Cassatt

Film and TV
Mother and Child (1924 film), a German silent film starring Henny Porten
Mother and Child (1934 film), a German sound remake also starring Porten
Mother and Child (2009 film), an American drama film directed and written by Rodrigo García
"Mother and Child" (Sliders), a television episode
 An episode of Ghost in the Shell: Stand Alone Complex

Music
 Mother and Child, a 2002 choral composition by John Tavener
 Mother and Child (song cycle), composed in 1918 by John Ireland on poems by Cristina Rossetti
Mother and Child, an album by Tenebrae

See also 
 "Mother and Child Reunion", a song by Paul Simon on his 1972 album Paul Simon
 Mother and Child Reunion (Degrassi: The Next Generation), two-part pilot episode of the Canadian teen drama television series Degrassi: The Next Generation
Mother and Child Scheme (AKA Mother and Child Service), a former healthcare programme in Ireland
 Madonna and Child, a representation of Mary and the baby Jesus, a central icon in both Catholic and Orthodox Christianity; see Madonna